The Shocking Miss Pilgrim is a 1947 American musical comedy film in Technicolor written and directed by George Seaton and starring Betty Grable and Dick Haymes.

The screenplay, based on a story by Ernest Maas and Frederica Maas, focuses on a young typist who becomes involved in the Women's Suffrage movement in 1874. The songs were composed by George and Ira Gershwin. Marilyn Monroe made her film debut as an uncredited voice as a telephone operator.

Plot
Cynthia Pilgrim is the top typewriting (i.e. typing) student of the first graduating class of the Packard Business College in New York City, and as such she is offered a position as a typewriter (i.e. typist) with the Pritchard Shipping Company in Boston. There, she finds an office of men overseen by office manager Mr. Saxon. When Cynthia introduces herself to company co-owner John Pritchard, he tells her he thought all expert typists were male and his policy is to hire only men. Cynthia asks for an opportunity to prove she's as efficient as her male counterparts, but John refuses and offers her train fare back to New York.

John's Aunt Alice, an avowed suffragist, has the controlling interest in the company and insists that Cynthia be given a chance. Cynthia finds lodgings at Catherine Dennison's (Elizabeth Patterson) boarding house, where she meets an eclectic group of tenants, including poet Leander Woolsey, artist Michael Michael, and musician Herbert Jothan.

John invites Cynthia to dinner but she prefers not to socialize with her employer. She does allow him to escort her to one of his aunt's suffragist rallies, where she impresses the other women, despite John's standing up from the audience and asking her awkward questions about management and labor getting closer together. When John's mother asks her to dine with them on the evening of the Regimental Ball, Cynthia feels she won't fit in with the woman's social circle, so her rooming house companions coach her on how to behave unpleasantly, thinking the mother would be a snob. Cynthia is delighted to discover their efforts were unnecessary, because Mrs. Pritchard proves to be down-to-earth and a supporter of Cynthia's desire to be treated equally in the workplace.

John begins to date Cynthia, and eventually they become engaged. He tries to persuade her to give up her involvement in the suffrage movement, but she insists she cannot abandon such a worthy cause. They break their engagement and she is fired from her job, but none of the people hired by Mr. Saxon to replace her please Mr. Pritchard. He and John go, in desperation, to a local school to find yet another candidate for the position. There, John discovers that its general manager is Cynthia, and the two are reunited in business as well as in love.

Cast

Production
In 1941, husband-and-wife screenwriting team Ernest Maas and Frederica Sagor collaborated on Miss Pilgrim's Progress, a story about a young woman who enters the business world by demonstrating the newly invented typewriter in the window of a Wall Street establishment. When she tries to fend off the unwanted advances of one of the firm's clerks, her employer comes to her rescue but is killed when he falls down the stairs in the ensuing altercation. Abigail Pilgrim becomes the focus of a murder trial that attracts widespread coverage by the media and the attention of Susan B. Anthony when the concept of women working in offices comes under fire.

Acting as their agent, Paul Kohner brought the story to several studios. RKO and MGM expressed some interest, but both eventually passed. 20th Century Fox finally purchased the screen rights, and initially planned on starring Jeanne Crain, but the project stalled. Finally, studio head Darryl F. Zanuck, searching for material for Betty Grable, decided to tailor it to her talents, cutting Crain loose. After it underwent several rewrites, Zanuck assigned the task of whipping the screenplay into shooting shape to George Seaton, who would also direct. Working with Kay Swift, Ira Gershwin sorted through songs he and his brother George had written but never used and selected eleven for the film's musical numbers. Frederica Sagor was unhappy with the tunes and later observed, "Not even if they had scraped the very bottom of the barrel could they have come up with something so unmelodious." Displeased with the treatment her and her husband's original story was given, she called the end result "another stupid boy-meets-girl Zanuck travesty."

Despite Betty Grable's popularity as a top moneymaking film star at this time, The Shocking Miss Pilgrim was a box office disappointment.

Song list
 Sweet Packard
 Music by George Gershwin
 Lyrics by Ira Gershwin
 Performed by ensemble
 Changing My Tune
 Music by George Gershwin
 Lyrics by Ira Gershwin
 Performed by Betty Grable
 Stand Up and Fight
 Music by George Gershwin
 Lyrics by Ira Gershwin
 Performed by Anne Revere, Betty Grable, Dick Haymes and ensemble
 Aren't You Kinda Glad We Did?
 Music by George Gershwin
 Lyrics by Ira Gershwin
 Performed by Dick Haymes and Betty Grable
 The Back Bay Polka
 Music by George Gershwin
 Lyrics by Ira Gershwin
 Performed by Allyn Joslyn, Charles Kemper, Elizabeth Patterson, Lillian Bronson
Arthur Shields and Betty Grable

 One, Two, Three
 Music by George Gershwin
 Lyrics by Ira Gershwin
 Performed by Dick Haymes and ensemble
 Danced by Betty Grable and Dick Haymes
 Waltzing is Better Sitting Down
 Music by George Gershwin
 Lyrics by Ira Gershwin
 Performed by Dick Haymes and Betty Grable
 Demon Rum
 Music by George Gershwin
 Lyrics by Ira Gershwin
 Performed by ensemble
 For You, For Me, For Evermore
 Music by George Gershwin
 Lyrics by Ira Gershwin
 Performed by Dick Haymes and Betty Grable

Critical reception
Bosley Crowther of The New York Times felt in a few of the songs "a certain exuberance is momentarily achieved," but he thought "the bulk of the music is as sticky as toothpaste being squeezed out of a tube." He added, "Miss Grable and Mr. Haymes are neither given nor deserve a script if the caliber of their performances is a valid criterion, and several other minor actors behave ridiculously in silly roles. There is no more voltage in The Shocking Miss Pilgrim than in a badly used dry cell."

References

External links
 
 
 
 
 
 

1947 films
1947 musical comedy films
1947 romantic comedy films
1940s English-language films
1940s feminist films
1940s romantic musical films
20th Century Fox films
American feminist comedy films
American musical comedy films
American romantic comedy films
American romantic musical films
Films directed by George Seaton
Films produced by William Perlberg
Films scored by Alfred Newman
Films scored by David Raksin
Films set in 1874
Films set in Massachusetts
George Gershwin in film
1940s American films